Staryye Turbasly (İśke Turbaślı) is a rural locality (a selo) in Ufa, Bashkortostan, Russia. The population was 1,395 as of 2010. There are 20 streets.

Geography 
Staryye Turbasly is located 31 km northeast of Ufa. Arkhangelsky is the nearest rural locality.

References 

Rural localities in Ufa urban okrug